Nothocestrum peltatum, the Oahu aiea, is a species of flowering plant in the nightshade family, Solanaceae, that is endemic to the island of Kauai in Hawaii. There are only about 23 individuals remaining.

Oahu aiea is threatened by habitat loss. It is also threatened by introduced species of plants in its habitat, such as banana poka (Passiflora tarminiana), passionfruit (Passiflora edulis), daisy fleabane (Erigeron karvinskianus) (daisy fleabane), lantana (Lantana camara), blackberry (Rubus argutus), karakanut (Corynocarpus laevigatus), and air plant (Bryophyllum pinnatum).

References

Physaleae
Endemic flora of Hawaii
Biota of Kauai
Trees of Hawaii
Taxonomy articles created by Polbot